The Embassy of Israel in Washington, D.C. is the diplomatic mission of the State of Israel to the United States. It is located at 3514 International Drive, Washington, DC, in the North Cleveland Park neighborhood.

History
The Ambassador is Michael Herzog. In addition to the ambassador, the embassy includes 13 departments that seek to strengthen the relationship between the United States and Israel. These departments include the Defense and Armed Forces Attache, the Political Department, Congressional Affairs, Public Diplomacy, Defense and Armed Forces, Economic Mission, Commercial Mission, the Minister for Administrative Affairs and Consul, Police and Security, Academic Affairs, Cultural Affairs, Press Office, and Agriculture and Science.

The embassy hosts numerous events for politicians and the general public throughout the year, including a celebration for Yom Ha'atzmaut, Israel's Independence Day.

References

External links

Official website
wikimapia

Israel
Washington, D.C.
Israel–United States relations
Jews and Judaism in Washington, D.C.